is a video game developed by Produce! and Hudson Soft and released on the Super Nintendo Entertainment System. It was released in Japan on April 28, 1994, in North America later the same year, and in Europe on February 23, 1995. 

It is the second installment of the Super Bomberman series, part of the larger Bomberman franchise, and the only installment without a 2-player story mode (although one was originally planned).

Gameplay

Story Mode
The story mode consists of walking through maze-like areas filled with blocks, monsters, and switches with a goal of opening the gate leading to the next area. To accomplish this, the player lays bombs to destroy all the monsters and flip all the switches. Destroying blocks in the maze will uncover useful power-ups to increase their bomb count, firepower, speed, and grant them special abilities such as remote control bombs, throwing bombs, and taking an extra hit.

There are 5 worlds total, and at the end of each world is a boss. Each boss is first battled on foot before retreating into a giant machine. After the boss is defeated, the player will move on to the next world.

Multiplayer
In Battle Mode, 2 players (4 with a multitap) can face off against one another in one of 12 arenas designed specifically for multiplayer. Matches can be customized as battle royal matches or team matches. A special option called G-Bomber was added making the winner of each match golden and giving them an item to begin the next match with a power up as determined by spinning a wheel at the end of the match.

Story
5 evil cyborgs called the Five Dastardly Bombers are bent on taking over the universe. On Earth, they capture the original Bomberman, and he is placed in a prison cell in their space station. He awakens in the dungeon of Magnet Bomber and must fight his way to a final showdown with the Magnet Bomber himself. In the following four worlds, Bomberman will challenge Golem Bomber, Pretty Bomber, Brain Bomber, and their leader, Plasma Bomber, in an effort to free the Earth and himself from these alien invaders.

Reception 

Scary Larry of GamePro gave the game a positive review, praising the strategic gameplay, cute graphics, and music, though he remarked that the single player mode is considerably less engaging than the multiplayer. Next Generation reviewed the game, rating it five stars out of five, and stated that "This is truly God's perfect party game."

Next Generations 1996 lexicon of video game terms included the joke entries "Bomb-o'clock" and "Bombaholic", in which they referred to Super Bomberman 2 as "the videogame of choice for game developers everywhere". Later that year they named it the 3rd best game of all time, saying it "epitomizes the Japanese art of taking a ludicrously simple concept, and then executing that concept faultlessly. The control is superb, the graphics are ultimately functional ... the play is balanced to perfection - and four players won't have more fun doing anything else. We mean it. [Warcraft II: Tides of Darkness], Quake, Daytona USA - they're all great multiplayer games. But Super Bomberman 2 is better." In 1999, Next Generation also listed Super Bomberman 2 as number 30 on their "Top 50 Games of All Time", commenting that, "Of all the games that came out of the 16-bit era, Super Bomberman 2 remains a timeless reminder of the ingenuity and purity of gameplay that characterized Nintendo's world-beating console." IGN ranked the game 89th on their Top 100 SNES Games of All Time. In 1995, Total! listed the game 3rd on their "Top 100 SNES Games." In 1996, GamesMaster rated the game 6th in its "The GamesMaster SNES Top 10." In the same issue, they also listed the game 10th in their "Top 100 Games of All Time" and at the time opined SuperBomberman 2 is "The best multi-player game in the world." The game sold over 713,000 copies in Japan alone.

Notes

References

External links 
 Super Bomberman 2 - Hudson Game Navi at Hudson Soft (Japanese) on Wayback Machine
 Super Bomberman 2 at GameFAQs
 Super Bomberman 2 at Giant Bomb
 Super Bomberman 2 at MobyGames

1994 video games
Action video games
Bomberman
Hudson Soft games
Multiplayer and single-player video games
Produce! games
Puzzle video games
Super Nintendo Entertainment System games
Super Nintendo Entertainment System-only games
Video games developed in Japan
Video games scored by Yasuhiko Fukuda